Archie Marshall may refer to:
 Archie Marshall (politician)
 Archie Marshall (basketball)
 Archie Marshall (speed skater)

See also
 Archibald Marshall, English author, publisher and journalist